Anne Mumbi Waiguru, EGH, (born 16 April 1971) is the second Governor of Kirinyaga County in Kenya, who has been in office since 22 August 2017.  She was re-elected to office as Governor for her second 5 year term in the elections that were held on 9th August 2022.  Previously, she served as the first Cabinet Secretary in the Ministry of Devolution and Planning . She was nominated by H.E. President Uhuru Kenyatta to the position on 25 April 2013. She is behind the establishment of Huduma Centres, places where Kenyan citizens can access government services more efficiently at their respective counties. as well as the 30% procurement rule, which accords at least 30 per cent of all supply contracts to the government to the youth, persons with disability and women.

Anne Mumbi Waiguru is the first of only seven women Governors in Kenya who were elected in the August 9th  2022 Kenyan general election. These seven Kenyan female governors include Anne Waiguru -Kirinyaga County, Susan Kihika -Nakuru County, Gladys Wanga-Homa Bay County, Cecicly Mbarire -Embu County, Wavinya Ndeti-Machakos County and Fatuma Achani -Kwale County as well as  Kawira Mwangaza -Meru County  .This the highest number of women in this position since the implementation of the devolved system of government in Kenya in 2013. During the 2017 general election, history was made with the first three women to be elected as female governors in Kenya against a total of 44 male governors. This came in after the promulgation of the 2010 Constitution which saw Anne Waiguru-Kirinyaga County Governor,  Charity Ngilu- Kitui County Governor and the late Joyce Laboso- Bomet County Governor break the glass ceiling and occupy office as female governors in their respective counties.

Anne Waiguru served as the first female Vice Chair of the Council of Governors in Kenya between December 2017 and January 2019, and currently she is the chairperson of the Council of Governors in 2022. In September 2022 she was elected as the Council of Governors Chair a position that puts her as the first female Council of Governors Chair in the country. She took over from former Embu County Governor Hon.Martin Wambora. Waiguru was contesting for this seat against Hon.Joseph Ole Lenku who is the current Governor of Kajiado County.

Education
She attended Nairobi River Primary School and later Precious Blood Girls' Secondary School, Riruta where she sat for her O-Level exams in 1987. She then joined Moi Forces Academy  in Nairobi where she sat for her A-Level exams in 1989. At Moi Forces Academy, Waiguru studied mathematics, physics and chemistry.  Upon graduating from Egerton University with a bachelor's degree in agriculture and home economics, she worked for Transparency International as an intern and research assistant, and then joined the Kenya Leadership Institute. Waiguru holds a master's degree in economics from the University of Nairobi, and has specialized experience in public finance, financial management systems, public service reform, capacity building and governance.

Career
Anne Waiguru began her career in the public service by providing technical assistance to the Public Service Reform Secretariat in what was then the Cabinet Office. She then served as the Head of Governance and the Economic Stimulus Programme at the National Treasury , alternate to the Permanent Secretary/National Treasury in the Public Procurement Oversight Authority and advisory board and the Women Enterprise Fund Board. She was successfully nominated in 2011 as one of the Top 40 under 40 women in the country, the only nominee at the time from the Public Service.

Waiguru was the director of Integrated Financial Management and Information System (IFMIS) , and Head of Governance at the National Treasury. She served briefly as a senior public sector manager/assistant vice president, at Citi-group. Previously, she served as a technical advisor in the Cabinet Office, Office of the President on secondment from the World Bank .
Waiguru has served as the alternate to the Permanent Secretary National Treasury in the Public Procurement Oversight Authority Advisory Board, and, the Women Enterprise Fund  Board.#WTCPresident Mwai Kibaki honoured Ann Waiguru with an Order Grand Warrior title due to her exemplary performance at the Information System and Integrated Financial Management.Her team through her leadership also won three Awards for good Performance in the Public Service.

At the end of August 2016, Anne Waiguru declared her interest in politics and registered for TNA membership.  This was in preparation for the 2017 general election where she was planning to vie for the Kirinyaga County gubernatorial seat.

Kirinyaga Governor
In 2017, Waiguru was elected Governor of Kirinyaga county, making her one of only three women governors in the country.  She steered the county in developing a Sessional Paper for the county stipulating a 15-year visionary agenda titled the Mountain Cities Blueprint. The paper is the first sub-national paper in the country.  She has also undertaken healthcare reforms, transport and infrastructure upgrades and is developing an industrial park to manufacture local produce.

She has implemented a social economic empowerment program dubbed Wezesha Kirinyaga, that focuses on four value chains namely poultry, dairy, avocado and tomatoes.  In poultry, 32 community groups comprising 900 households are supported to produce one million eggs a month, earning an extra KSh.1,000/= daily for each of the households.  The dairy, avocado and tomato projects focus on establishment of processing factories with an aim of adding value to agricultural produce.

The other project is an apparel factory where women are engaged in making hospital linen and school uniforms to earn a living.

References

Egerton University alumni
University of Nairobi alumni
Government ministers of Kenya
Women government ministers of Kenya
21st-century Kenyan women politicians
21st-century Kenyan politicians
County Governors of Kenya
1971 births
Living people